American Airlines Flight 1 may refer to:

 American Airlines Flight 1 (1936), an accident involving a Douglas DC-2
 American Airlines Flight 1 (1941), an accident involving a Douglas DC-3 
 American Airlines Flight 1 (1962), an accident involving a Boeing 707

Flight number disambiguation pages